The Eleventh Council of Ministers of Bosnia and Herzegovina (Bosnian and Croatian: Jedanaesti saziv Vijeća ministara Bosne i Hercegovine) was the Council of Ministers of Bosnia and Herzegovina cabinet formed on 12 January 2012, following the 2010 general election and the one-year governmental formation crisis. It was led by Chairman of the Council of Ministers Vjekoslav Bevanda. The cabinet was dissolved on 31 March 2015 and was succeeded by a new Council of Ministers presided over by Denis Zvizdić.

Governmental formation crisis

Following the 2010 general election, a process of formation of Bosnia and Herzegovina's Council of Ministers had begun. The resulting election produced a fragmented political landscape without a coalition of a parliamentary majority more than a year after the election. The centre-left Social Democratic Party of Bosnia and Herzegovina (SDP BiH), the largest party in the Federation of Bosnia and Herzegovina, and the Bosnian Serb autonomist Alliance of Independent Social Democrats (SNSD), the largest party in Republika Srpska, each had 8 MPs of the total 42 MPs of the House of Representatives (28 from the Federation and 14 from Republika Srpska).

After months of political wrangling and deadlock, in late 2011, the Council of Ministers had been solved, however the country remained in a situation of perpetual political crisis.

Investiture

Party breakdown
Party breakdown of cabinet ministers:

Cabinet members
The Cabinet was structured into the offices for the chairman of the Council of Ministers, the two vice chairs and 9 ministries.

References

External links
Website of the Council of Ministers

2012 establishments in Bosnia and Herzegovina
Cabinets established in 2012
2015 disestablishments in Bosnia and Herzegovina
Cabinets disestablished in 2015